Christian Marcoux (born 4 April 1969) is a Canadian freestyle skier. He competed in the men's moguls event at the 1992 Winter Olympics.

References

1969 births
Living people
Canadian male freestyle skiers
Olympic freestyle skiers of Canada
Freestyle skiers at the 1992 Winter Olympics
Skiers from Quebec City